Max Sánchez Barrantes (born 2 January 1973) is a retired Costa Rican professional footballer.

Club career
Sánchez once boasted the record of having played for the most clubs in Costa Rica's Primera Division de Costa Rica, alongside former teammate Evance Benwell, but was finally surpassed by Benwell who notched up 12 different teams.

He among others played for Santos de Guápiles, Cartaginés, Santa Bárbara, Saprissa, Puntarenas and Liberia Mía in the Primera Division de Costa Rica. In summer 2002 he was on the verge of signing for Greek side OFI Crete.

In summer 2010 he returned to the Premier Division when he joined Limón from second division Municipal Grecia.

International career
A tall holding midfielder, Sánchez made four appearances for the Costa Rica national football team, his debut coming in the 2002 CONCACAF Gold Cup semi-final against South Korea.

References

External links
 
 Profile at Nacion 

1973 births
Living people
Association football defenders
Costa Rican footballers
Costa Rica international footballers
2002 CONCACAF Gold Cup players
Deportivo Saprissa players
Municipal Pérez Zeledón footballers
A.D. San Carlos footballers
A.D. Ramonense players
Santos de Guápiles footballers
C.S. Cartaginés players
Puntarenas F.C. players
Municipal Liberia footballers
Municipal Grecia players